Sédatif en fréquences et sillons is an EP by the Montreal-based Fly Pan Am. The name of the album roughly translates to "sedative in frequencies and furrows."

The recording features additional work by Norsola Johnson and Aidan Girt, perhaps better known as members of Godspeed You! Black Emperor.

Track listing
 "De cercle en cercle, ressasser et se perdre dans l'illusion née de la production de distractions et multiplier la statique environnante!" ("From Circle to Circle, to Rehash and Get Lost in the Illusion Born of the Production of Distractions, and Increase the Surrounding Static!") – 14:34
 "Éfférant/Afférant" ("Unrelated / Related") – 11:02
 "Micro Sillons" ("LPs") – 3:59

Personnel

Fly Pan Am
 Jonathan Parant – guitar, tapes
 Felix Morel – drums, tapes
 Roger Tellier-Craig – guitar, tapes
 J.S. Truchy – bass guitar, tapes

Other musicians
 Norsola Johnson – vocals (on "De cercle en cercle [...]")

Production
 Aidan Girt – additional recording (on "De cercle en cercle [...]")
 Efrim Menuck – record producer
 Thierry Amar – record producer
 Fly Pan Am – record producer

References

External links
 Cstrecords.com, the official homepage of Constellation Records.

Fly Pan Am albums
2000 EPs
Constellation Records (Canada) EPs